Dhaka Residential Model College (also referred to as DRMC) is a historic public and residential school, located at Mirpur Road, Mohammadpur, in Dhaka, Bangladesh. The college offers education for students ranging from third grade to twelfth grade (approximately ages 8 to 18). DRMC is the largest residential and public school and college in the country.

History
Dhaka Residential Model College was established in 1960 by Pakistani President Ayub Khan, in an area of about 52 acre beside Mirpur Road near Sher-e-Bangla Nagar in Dhaka.

In 1962, the administration of DRMC was assumed by the provincial government of then East Pakistan.

In 1965, the government converted the institution into an autonomous body, and its administration was relegated to a board of governors with the Chief Secretary as its chairman. In 1967, the government again took control of the school. At that time, a new board of governors was constituted with the Education Secretary as its chairman.

The initial purpose of establishing DRMC was to provide education for the sons of elite military officers and high-ranking government officials in East Pakistan. The school, and later the college, were modeled after public schools in the United Kingdom (according to the British Public Schools Act 1868), particularly Eton College.

The house system was designed to resemble Eton's. After the independence of Bangladesh, a board of governors was appointed with the Education Secretary as its chairman. Since its inception, the school has been funded through government grants and minimal student fees. The Board of Governors has been empowered to “frame rules as it deems necessary for the proper functioning of the school”.

The school began with only one study session, known as the Morning shift which operates from 8:00 a.m. to 12:45 p.m. In March 1993, another session is known as the Day shift was added, according to the education expansion policy of the government, to cope with the growing number of students.

The day shift session operates from 1:00 p.m. to 5:45 p.m. Measures were taken to build a gymnasium, park, swimming pool, auditorium, mosque, administrative building,hospital and residences for the principal, vice-principal, teachers and school staff.

The school opened in eleventh and twelfth grades in 1967. In 1978, another dormitory named Lalon Shah House was built for students in grades 11–12. In 2008, a four-storied house named Dr. Muhammad Shahidullah was built for students of the day shift.

Academics

Dhaka Residential Model College offers both primary and secondary education and emphasizes student discipline in all of their activities. It has laboratories for physics, chemistry, Information and communications technology, biology, mathematics, agriculture and geography and a library with more than 20,000 books, journals, newspapers, manuscripts and magazines. The academic year is divided into two terms.

In addition to a terminal exam, three class tests are held each term. Students have to sit for the Secondary School Certificate (SSC) examination at the end of the 10th grade, and the Higher Secondary Certificate (HSC) at the end of the 12th grade. At the completion of the 5th grade, students have to sit for the Primary Education Completion Exam (PECE) examination program.

Students at the end of the 8th grade sit for the Junior School Certificate (JSC). The school employs about 200 teaching staff and 80 non-teaching staff. The student-teacher ratio is 20:1. Teachers occasionally attend training programs organized by different government institutions. The school had more training workshops for its teachers than any other neighboring cluster of schools in 2000, under the English Language Teaching Improvement Project, which is funded by the British and Bangladeshi governments.

Admission
Although Dhaka Residential Model College operates from the 3rd through the 12th grade, it only admits students into the 3rd, 6th, 9th and 11th grades. Most competitive admission is for the students admitted in the 3rd grade.

Admission in the 3rd and 9th grades are based on admission tests. The admission tests for DRMC are highly competitive,with around 300 students accepted from around 20000 applicants for the 3rd grade. Students in these grades are admitted through written and Oral exam tests for both the morning and day shifts.

Students who pass the written test have to qualify for the viva exam. In addition to written and viva tests, candidates have to go through a medical examination as well. Admission to the 11th grade is determined by a student's grade point average (GPA) in the SSC examination. Thousands of students with the highest grades in the SSC compete for admission as the school has limited enrollment in every grade.

Curriculum
Dhaka Residential Model College's curriculum includes traditional primary, secondary, and intermediate-level academic subjects. Students of primary classes take academic core subjects including Bengali language, English language, mathematics, social science, science, arts and crafts, religion, and physical education. Students have to take agricultural science after completing their primary education.

Students of the secondary level have to elect one of the three major programs: humanities; business studies; and science. Students of the intermediate level (grades 11 and 12), have to select one of the three major programs as well. Students have some compulsory subjects and some optional subjects in each of the programs.

Campus
Dhaka Residential Model College is located on a 52 acres of green field. The campus is in northwest Dhaka at Mirpur Road, just opposite the official residence of the Prime Minister.

With 20 buildings (including the newly built Dr. Muhammad Shahidullah House), six of which are dormitories, it is one of the largest residential colleges in the country. The campus consists of dormitories, eight teachers' quarters, individual residences for the principal and vice-principal, staff quarters, a mosque, five basketball courts, several volleyball courts, tens of cricket and football fields, a laundry shop, an auditorium, an administrative building, eight full-size football fields, and an infirmary.

The infirmary, which houses 20 beds, has arrangements for the treatment of common diseases and necessary vaccinations. It is headed by two doctors and has several pharmacists. The school has its own water-pump for the water supply of the college.

In total, the college has 15 fields and playgrounds. Three buildings known as Academic Buildings are used for academic purposes. Academic Building 1, for ninth grade through to twelfth grade, is located at the northeast side; Academic Building 2, for third grade through to the eighth grade, is located at the southeast corner of the campus.

Academic Building 3 is newly opened and started organizing classes and exams in the limit. A monument has been built in front of Academic Building 1 to commemorate those killed during the Bengali Language Movement demonstrations of 1952. The Language Movement was a political effort in East Pakistan, advocating the recognition of the Bengali language as an official language of Pakistan. This campus also has a big Banyan Tree known as 'Bot Tola', (Bengali: বট তলা) which is in front of Academic Building 2. Every year 'Annual Cultural Week' is held there.

Houses 

There are 7 houses in this school. But, one of them is not a real house (Jashimuddin House), rather it is a team for junior day shift students. List of the houses is given below. Hence, Only morning shift student stay in house.

Junior Houses 

  Dr. Qudrat-E-Khuda House:- This house was first created in April 1960. Its first name was Jinnah House. After Bangladesh got independence, this house got named as 1 Number House. After some time, it got renamed as Dr. Qudrat-E-Khuda House. This house gets lots of prizes in many competitions as well as in studies. Current House Master: Fatima Nur; Current House Tutor: Ayesha Khatun; Current House Elder: Minhajul Islam Mahin & Current Prefect: Tanvir Ahmed. 
  Zainul Abedin House:- This house was first created in May 1961. Its first name was Ayub House. After Bangladesh got independence, this house got named as Zainul Abedin House. This house has full of talents in studies and sports. Current House Master: MD. Khairul Alam; Current House Tutor: Syed Mahbub Hasan Amiri; Current House Elder: Ruhanul Haque Talukder Araf & Current House Prefect: Snehashish Bhowmik Ratul.
  Jasimuddin House:- There is no particular residence for this house and was for day shift students. In 2008, this house was founded. Current House Master: MD. Shahriar Kabir; Current House Tutor: MD. Rafsanur Rahman; Current House Elder: Arafat Islam Tamim & Current House Prefect: Rashik Raiyan Proyash.

Senior houses 
  Fazlul Huq House
  Nazrul Islam House
  Lalon Shah House:- From 1960 to 1976, this house was used as the medical centre. In 1977, it got started as a house named as 3 Number House. On 10 September 1978, late principal Colonel Jiauddin Ahmed named this house as Lalon Shah House.
  Dr. Muhammad Shahidullah House:-  For the problems of day shift students, on 20 March 2008, this house was founded.

Extracurricular activities
Due to the size of the college, extracurricular activities offered at Dhaka Residential Model College are many and varied, and are a major feature of DRMC. In addition to established sports, the college also has total 18 Clubs including Boy Scout troop & BNCC Platoon.

Students participate in different programs and contests like debating contests, art competitions, music, sports and athletics, essay writing, performing arts, quizzes, science fairs; math, chemistry, physics, and astronomy Olympiads; and other extracurricular activities at both national and international levels.

Clubs

The college has total 18 active extracurricular clubs. They are:
 DRMC Science Club
 DRMC IT Club
 Remians Art Club
 Remians Music Club
 Remians Youth Red Crescent
 Remians Debating Society 
 Remians Language Club
 DRMC Math Club
 DRMC MUN Association
 DRMC Islamic Cultural Club
 DRMC Photography Club
 DRMC Business & Career Club
 DRMC Social Service Club
 DRMC BNCC Platoon
 DRMC Scouts
 DRMC Youth Club
 DRMC Games & Sports Club
 DRMC Nature Club

Sports
Among the outdoor games, football and cricket are the most popular. Cricket is played in winter while football in summer. DRMC has teams for football, cricket, volleyball, hockey and basketball that participate in national and regional games. The DRMC football team reached the finals and became runner-up in the first-ever Inter-School Football Tournament 2003; one of its players won the Man of the Match trophy.

The team won the championship in the Inter-School Football Competition for the first time in 2006. DRMC also hosts many tournaments on its grounds. Within the college, teams from the houses take part in annual football, cricket, basketball and volleyball tournaments. It also holds indoor game tournaments such as table tennis and chess. Currently, they are the champions of Dhaka zone football in 2022.

Quiz bowl
DRMC students actively take part in various quiz bowls. The DRMC quiz team became champions in a competition organized by Bangladesh Television in 2001. Among 50 competing schools, the DRMC team won first place by defeating Viqarunnisa Noon School. DRMC students, who have done well in many quiz bowls since 2001, won championships in the quiz contest at Notre Dame College Science Festival 2002, Standard Chartered-Prothom Alo 14th Inter College Quiz Contest hosted by the National Defence College, India, 28th National Science & IT Week 2005, Inter-School Quiz Contest 2006 hosted by Shishu Academy and BCSIR Science Fair, the national level science fair hosted annually by the Bangladesh Council of Scientific and Industrial Research.

DRMC quiz team 'Platinum' became champion in The HSBC Prothom Alo Language Competition in 2005 both at the regional and national level.
DRMC quiz team 'BOMARU' secured the championship in the National Inter-School quiz competition organized by Bangladesh Shishu Academy in 2009. DRMC quiz team became champion in 2017 'Quiz Quiz', an interschool quiz competition organized by Bangladesh Television.

Publications
DRMC publishes a magazine annually, Shandipan, containing school-related news, poems, articles, stories, science fiction, jokes, and other items of interest, written by the students, teachers, and staff. The magazine reflects the creativity of the college and provides an opportunity for students to express their thoughts. In addition, the college publishes supplements and souvenirs on the occasion of special functions and events such as the Science club publishes souvenir named "Aurora" and the Language club publishes "Dhoni".

Notable alumni
 Sheikh Jamal, the second son of the founding leader of Bangladesh. Father of the nation Bangabandhu Sheikh Mujibur Rahman and slain brother of the current Prime Minister Sheikh Hasina
 Shamsher M. Chowdhury, former Foreign Secretary of the Bangladesh 
 Tarique Rahman, politician and Senior Joint Secretary-General of the Bangladesh Nationalist Party (BNP)
 Leepu Nizamuddin Awlia, automotive engineer, designer and coachbuilder
 Mohamed Mijarul Quayes, former Foreign Secretary of Bangladesh
 Nasrul Hamid Bipu, MP for constituency Dhaka-3 and State Minister of Power, Energy & Mineral Resources, Bangladesh and the president of ORWA
 Kabir Bin Anwar, senior secretary of the Ministry of Water Resources, Bangladesh
 AKM Enamul Haque Shamim, deputy minister of Ministry of Water Resources, Bangladesh

See also
 Remians

References

External links

 
 ORWA (Old Remians Welfare Association)

 
Colleges in Dhaka District
Schools in Dhaka District
Educational institutions established in 1960
1960 establishments in East Pakistan
Boarding schools in Bangladesh